List of the National Register of Historic Places listings in Genesee County, New York

This is intended to be a complete list of properties and districts listed on the National Register of Historic Places in Genesee County, New York.  The locations of National Register properties and districts (at least for all showing latitude and longitude coordinates below) may be seen in a map by clicking on "Map of all coordinates".  One property, the Holland Land Office, is further designated a National Historic Landmark.



Listings county-wide

|}

See also

National Register of Historic Places listings in New York

References

Genesee County, New York
Genesee County